K.I.D. was a British musician and the 1980s Italo disco musician best known for his SAM import and club hit "You Don't Like My Music (Hupendi Muziki Wangu?!)" that entered the Billboard Club charts. The name is a pseudonym used by Geoffrey Bastow.

Career

Bastow, who is also known as Geoff Bastow (20 May 1949 in Yorkshire, England – 16 March 2007 in Berlin, Germany), was a Munich-based English songwriter and record producer.

In the early 1970s, Bastow recorded albums such as Music To Varnish Owls By (1975), Flavour Of The Month (1977) and The Video Age (1980) for various British labels. Originally working as a guitarist and pianist in dance bands around Yorkshire, he moved to London in the early 1970s, and then Munich in around 1976. He collaborated with disco/electronic innovator Giorgio Moroder around that era. He also toured with Engelbert Humperdinck's band as a guitarist.

Aside from his main work as K.I.D., he has also worked as a session musician for Euro disco acts such as Amanda Lear (1981 album Incognito), Boney M (1981 album  Boonoonoonoos), Mick Jackson and Gary Lux.

He wrote songs for artists including Elton John (song "Born Bad" from Victim of Love) and Suzi Lane ("Harmony"). Bastow co-composed with Mick Jackson the Austrian entry for Eurovision Song Contest in 1985, entitled "Kinder dieser Welt" which was sung by Gary Lux. The song placed 8th among 19 songs.

Bastow, as an electronic act called K.I.D. managed to get into the Billboard Dance Club charts in 1981. It entered the chart around September 1981, reaching No. 54 in 26 September, respectively. Around 14 November, it jumped to position No. 10. His brother Trevor (1945–2000) was also a noted London composer and session pianist. His younger brother Phil Bastow is also a musician.

Bastow has had a number of his compositions used in notable video productions. Some of his music can be heard in the children's video series There Goes a... also known as Real Wheels hosted by Dave Hood and Richard Blade's Video One. For example, in the video There Goes a Fire Truck, his songs "Current Advances 1", "Current Advances 3", "and Horizons 1" are used as background music. "Daytime Drama" was used in the SpongeBob SquarePants episode "Dumped". Posthumously, some of his production music has appeared in Check It Out! with Dr. Steve Brule, an Adult Swim comedy show stylized to parody public-access television.
Geoffrey Bastow also contributed Lyrics for 'We Need Protection’, which was a song composed by Edwin Hind and Eckhart Debusmann techno-funk band ‘Picnic At The Whitehouse’ (CBS RECORDS/Portrait 1985 – 1990. This Record is still referred as one of the most Important songs of the eighties.
Bastow died in Berlin, Germany on 16 March 2007, at the age of 57.

Discography

Albums as K.I.D.

Albums as Geoff Bastow (Incomplete)

Singles as K.I.D.

References

British boogie musicians
British songwriters
SAM Records artists
British hi-NRG musicians
Eurodisco musicians
British Italo disco musicians
British expatriates in Germany
Musicians from Yorkshire
1949 births
2007 deaths